The Middle Way: A Study of the Problems of Economic and Social Progress in a Free and Democratic Society is a book on political philosophy written by Harold Macmillan (British Conservative Party politician and later prime minister of the United Kingdom). It was originally published in 1938 (by Macmillan & Co, Ltd, London). It advocated a broadly centrist approach to the domestic and international problems of that time, and was written during a period when Macmillan was out of active office. He called for a programme of nationalisation at least as ambitious as then advocated by the Labour Party (UK).

Content
It is subtitled 'A Study of the Problems of Economic and Social Progress in a Free and Democratic Society' and is divided into 3 main sections
 Part 1 The Needs
Ch I The Emergence of a New Doctrine
Ch II Life and Liberty
Ch III The End of Radical Reformism
Ch IV Minimum Needs and Present Incomes
Ch V Present Methods of Distribution
Ch VI What Has to be Done

Part 2 The Methods
Ch VII Past Theories and Present Needs
Ch VIII Public Enterprise & Private Combination
Ch IX The Aims of Economic Policy in the Future
Ch X Industrial Reconstruction
Ch XI Finance
Ch XII Foreign Trade
Ch XIII Co-ordination

Part 3 The Benefits
Ch XIV The Minimum Wage
Ch XV A Minimum for the Unemployed
Ch XVI Public Utility Distribution
Ch XVII Economic Security
Ch XVII Freedom & Progress

See also
Third Way

References

Macmillan H (1978) The Middle Way, EP Publishing Ltd. 

1938 non-fiction books
Books in political philosophy
Books by Harold Macmillan
Books written by prime ministers of the United Kingdom
Random House books